Ansu Kabia is a British actor. He attended the Drama Centre London and was a former member of the Royal Shakespeare Company Ensemble. He is best known for his starring role in the British period detective series Miss Scarlet & the Duke as the character Moses.

Early in his career, Kabia starred in the live production of To Sir, With Love, based on E. R. Braithwaite’s autographical novel. The 2013 play was adapted by Ayub Khan Din and directed by Mark Babych.  Kabia received a positive review from theater critic Michael Billington: “Ansu Kabia is ... outstanding as Ricky. He shows a faintly patrician figure slowly unbending before the less privileged without ever losing his dignity.” This was the first time To Sir, With Love was produced as a live performance. E. R. Braithwaite attended the play and called Kabia's performance of Ricky Braithwaite "excellent".

Career performances

TV programs

The following are selected television programs with performances by Ansu Kabia:

Films
The following are selected films with performances by Ansu Kabia:

Theatre
Below are selected live performances by Ansu Kabia.

References

External links

 Tuneful Radio interview with Ansu Kabia (2019)
 British Black and Asian Shakespeare Database: Ansu Kabia performances

Living people
Year of birth missing (living people)
Alumni of the Drama Centre London
Black British male actors
20th-century English male actors
21st-century English male actors
English male Shakespearean actors